Stephen Basso (born August 22, 1987 in San José) is a Costa Rican-born American  soccer player. Basso currently plays for the Harrisburg Heat in the Major Arena Soccer League, as well as serving as the head coach for Wake FC in the Women's Premier Soccer League.

Career

Youth and Amateur
Basso started playing soccer at age 5 in New Delhi, India where his father, a foreign service officer with the State Department, worked. Basso eventually settled in Columbia, Maryland, where he played on Soccer Association of Columbia/Howard County teams and high school soccer at Hammond High School, but did not attended college; instead, he left high school early and went to Germany when his father was assigned to Frankfurt. Basso signed for German lower-league side PSV Blau Gelb in 2003.

Basso spent a year with Blau Geld, before returning to the United States to join the youth academy of Major League Soccer side D.C. United, foregoing college soccer, Basso spent two years there, helping his team to the U17 National Championship Semi-Finals in 2004 and the U19 National Championship Semi-Finals in 2005.

Professional
Having not been offered a professional contract by DC, Basso initially returned to Germany, signing his first professional contract for SV Darmstadt 98. Basso spent the majority of his time in Darmstadt playing for team's reserves, never making a first team appearance, and returned to the United States in 2008 to sign for USL Second Division expansion franchise Real Maryland Monarchs. He made his professional debut on April 20, 2008 in Maryland's season opening 1-0 loss to the Western Mass Pioneers.

Basso signed for Crystal Palace Baltimore in 2009. On March 16, 2010 Baltimore announced the re-signing of Basso to a new contract for the 2010 season. He went on to make 24 league appearances for CPB over two seasons before leaving the club when it ceased operations at the end of 2010.

Basso signed with Harrisburg City Islanders of the USL Pro league on April 1, 2011. He scored his first professional goal in his fifth pro year, on May 22, 2011 in a 3-1 loss to Orlando City. Harrisburg City re-signed Basso in February 2012.

References

External links
Crystal Palace Baltimore bio

1987 births
Living people
People from Columbia, Maryland
Costa Rican emigrants to the United States
USL Second Division players
Soccer players from Maryland
USSF Division 2 Professional League players
USL Championship players
Crystal Palace Baltimore players
D.C. United players
Penn FC players
Evergreen Diplomats players
Real Maryland F.C. players
Richmond Kickers players
Costa Rican expatriate sportspeople in Germany
Association football defenders
Costa Rican footballers
Rochester Lancers (1967–1980) players
Harrisburg Heat (MASL) players
Major Arena Soccer League players
Major Indoor Soccer League (2008–2014) players
Ontario Fury players
American soccer coaches